SS Richard K. Call was a Liberty ship built in the United States during World War II. She was named after Richard K. Call, an American attorney and politician, the 3rd and 5th territorial governor of Florida. Before that, he was elected to the Florida Territorial Council and as a delegate to the US Congress from Florida.

Construction
Richard K. Call was laid down on 21 February 1944, under a Maritime Commission (MARCOM) contract, MC hull 2473, by the St. Johns River Shipbuilding Company, Jacksonville, Florida; she was sponsored by Mrs. Lee S. White, a yard employee, and was launched on 15 April 1944.

History
She was allocated to the United States Navigation Company, on 28 April 1944. On 17 December 1947, she was laid up in the James River Reserve Fleet, Lee Hall, Virginia. On 26 April 1952, she was laid up in the Hudson River Reserve Fleet, Jones Point, New York. On 27 April 1953, she was withdrawn from the fleet to be loaded with grain under the "Grain Program 1953", she returned loaded on 7 May 1953. On 22 January 1958, she was withdrawn to be unload, she returned on empty 30 January 1958. On 13 August 1958, she was withdrawn from the fleet to be loaded with grain under the "Grain Program 1958", she returned loaded on 28 August 1958. On 15 April 1959, she was withdrawn to be unload, she returned on empty 22 April 1959. She was sold for scrapping, 12 January 1970, to Union Minerals and Alloys Corporation, for $41,273.54. She was removed from the fleet on 16 April 1970.

References

Bibliography

 
 
 
 

 

Liberty ships
Ships built in Jacksonville, Florida
1944 ships
James River Reserve Fleet
Hudson River Reserve Fleet
Hudson River Reserve Fleet Grain Program